Not the fictional Illinois town from the Halloween film series.

Haddonfield is a borough located in Camden County, in the U.S. state of New Jersey. As of the 2020 United States census, the borough's population was 12,550, an increase of 957 (+8.3%) from the 2010 census count of 11,593, which in turn reflected a decline of 66 (−0.6%) from the 11,659 counted in the 2000 Census

Haddonfield was incorporated by an act of the New Jersey Legislature on April 6, 1875, within portions of Haddon Township following a referendum on the same day. The borough became an independent municipality in 1894. The borough was named for Elizabeth Haddon, an early settler of the area.

History 
The Haddonfield area was occupied by Lenni Lenape Native Americans. The Lenape disappeared from the local area when settlers arrived. Arrowheads and pottery shards have been found by residents by the banks of the Cooper River, hinting that there was a Native American settlement in Haddonfield at one point in time.

On October 23, 1682, Francis Collins, an English Quaker and a bricklayer by trade, became the first settler within the boundaries of what today is Haddonfield. Collins soon built a house, "Mountwell," on a tract of 400 acres.  Haddonfield was further developed by Elizabeth Haddon (1680–1762), whose Quaker father, John Haddon, bought a  tract of land in the English colony of West Jersey to escape religious persecution. Elizabeth set sail alone from Southwark, England to the New World in 1701. Shortly after her arrival, she made a marriage proposal to John Estaugh, a Quaker minister, and they were married in 1702.  The town was named for John Haddon, though he never came to America.

The Indian King Tavern, built in 1750, played a significant role in the American Revolutionary War.  During that war, the New Jersey Legislature met there, avoiding British forces, and in 1777, declared New Jersey to be an independent state. Today the tavern is a state historical site and museum. Nevertheless, since 1873, Haddonfield has been a dry town where alcohol cannot be sold though it can be brewed and distributed in town.

Haddonfield is a significant historic paleontology site. In 1838, William Estaugh Hopkins uncovered large bones in a marl pit in which he was digging. Hopkins displayed the bones at his home, Birdwood; and these bones sparked the interest of a visitor, William Foulke. In 1858, Foulke dug from the marl pit the first relatively complete skeleton of a dinosaur found in North America, Hadrosaurus foulkii.  The skeleton was assembled in 1868 and is still displayed at Philadelphia Academy of Natural Sciences.  A  replica of "Haddy" stands in the center of town. Hadrosaurus was recognized officially as the state dinosaur of New Jersey in June 1991.

In 1875, Haddonfield became the first community to secede from Haddon Township and become a self-governing borough. Haddonfield is noted for its historic homes, quaint shops, and legions of lawyers. As a legal center for southern New Jersey, the town houses the offices of more than 390 attorneys.

Haddonfield once was home to Symphony in C (formerly the Haddonfield Symphony), which is now based in nearby Collingswood, and performs at the Gordon Theater at Rutgers University-Camden.

Haddonfield is home to the second oldest volunteer fire company in continuous service in the United States. Haddon Fire Company No. 1 was established as Friendship Fire Company on March 8, 1764, by 26 townsmen.  Each member was to furnish two leather buckets while the company supplied six ladders and three fire hooks.

In 1971, Haddonfield became the second municipality in New Jersey (after Cape May) to establish a historic preservation district. In keeping with the historic appearance of the borough, some candidates for commissioner distribute colored ribbons to their supporters instead of yard signs.

Geography 
According to the United States Census Bureau, the borough had a total area of 2.84 square miles (7.36 km2), including 2.80 square miles (7.24 km2) of land and 0.05 square miles (0.12 km2) of water (1.58%).

The Cooper River forms the border between Haddonfield and Cherry Hill. Haddonfield shares land borders with Audubon, Barrington, Haddon Township, Haddon Heights, Lawnside, and Tavistock.

Bodies of water
Driscoll Pond, contained by a small wooden dam, is below Hopkins Pond, and Hopkins Pond flows into it. Driscoll Pond is part of the Hopkins Pond park.
Hopkins Pond is contained by a large earthen dam, and Hopkins Lane is built atop it. In recent years, local officials have raised concerns about the pond being contaminated with cyanobacteria that can produce toxic algae blooms.
Evans Pond is part of Wallworth Park and located above Wallworth Lake with a dam separating the two. Formerly Evans Pond was deep enough for small boats to sail on it.
Wallworth Lake, in Wallworth Park, is below Evans Pond, and contained by another dam.

Demographics

2010 census

The Census Bureau's 2006–2010 American Community Survey showed that (in 2010 inflation-adjusted dollars) median household income was $112,105 (with a margin of error of +/− $10,416) and the median family income was $129,100 (+/− $16,987). Males had a median income of $92,409 (+/− $10,521) versus $61,272 (+/− $6,669) for females. The per capita income for the borough was $55,955 (+/− $5,275). About 3.8% of families and 4.9% of the population were below the poverty line, including 4.5% of those under age 18 and 7.2% of those age 65 or over.

2000 census
As of the 2000 United States census there were 11,659 people, 4,496 households, and 3,255 families residing in the borough. The racial makeup of the borough was 96.47% White, 1.27% African American, 0.13% Native American, 1.12% Asian, 0.03% Pacific Islander, 0.32% from other races, and 0.67% from two or more races. 1.46% of the population were Hispanic or Latino of any race.

There were 4,496 households, out of which 35.0% had children under the age of 18 living with them, 62.9% were married couples living together, 7.1% had a female householder with no husband present, and 27.6% were non-families. 24.1% of all households were made up of individuals, and 11.0% had someone living alone who was 65 years of age or older. The average household size was 2.57 and the average family size was 3.09.

In the borough the population was spread out, with 27.2% under the age of 18, 3.7% from 18 to 24, 25.4% from 25 to 44, 27.9% from 45 to 64, and 15.9% who were 65 years of age or older. The median age was 41 years. For every 100 females, there were 90.4 males. For every 100 females age 18 and over, there were 85.1 males.

The median income for a household in the borough was $86,872, and the median income for a family was $103,597. Males had a median income of $73,646 versus $44,968 for females. The per capita income for the borough was $43,170. 2.2% of the population and 1.3% of families were below the poverty line. Out of the total population, 2.0% of those under the age of 18 and 3.2% of those 65 and older were living below the poverty line.

Notable locations 
The Indian King Tavern was a colonial American tavern where, in 1777, the New Jersey General Assembly held a meeting at which they officially declared New Jersey to be an independent state. It has since been declared a State Historic Site, restored to its original layout, and turned into a museum with guided tours available to the public.

On the "Main Street" of Haddonfield, King's Highway, there is a statue of a Hadrosaurus, a type of Dinosaur discovered in Haddonfield. The statue has been described as "the central landmark of downtown Haddonfield." The town is synonymous with the statue, it being a mascot of sorts for Haddonfield.

Parks and recreation
Haddonfield has several parks maintained by the Camden County Parks Department:
Pennypacker Park contains the Hadrosaurus Foulkii Leidy Site and is near the Cooper River.
Wallworth Park contains Evans Pond and Wallworth Pond. Evans Pond is dammed and flows into Wallworth Pond, which is also dammed. Each of these ponds is actually a section of the Cooper River, and the early headwaters of the Cooper flow into Evans Pond.
It also has several parks maintained by other groups:

 The Crows Woods Complex contains community gardens, fields for public use, and a hiking loop.
 Mountwell Park contains a small playground and a baseball field along with wooded areas.

Government

Local government 
The Borough of Haddonfield has been governed under the Walsh Act since 1913. The borough is one of 30 municipalities (of the 564) statewide that use the commission form of government. The governing body is comprised of three commissioners, who elected to concurrent four-year terms of office on a non-partisan basis as part of the May municipal elections. At a reorganization meeting held after the new council is seated, each Commissioner is assigned to oversee one of the three departments within the Borough and the Commissioners select a Mayor and may select a Deputy Mayor.

, the borough's commissioners are 
Mayor Colleen Bianco Bezich (Commissioner of Public Affairs and Public Safety), 
Kevin Roche (Commissioner of Revenue and Finance) and 
Frank Troy (Commissioner of Public Works, Parks and Public Buildings), all of whom are serving concurrent terms of office ending May 2025.

In July 2019, Robert Marshall was selected to fill the seat as commissioner that became vacant following the resignation of John Moscatelli the previous month. Marshall served on an interim basis until the November 2019 general election, when voters elected Colleen Bianco Bezich to serve the balance of the term of office through May 2021.

Although the commission is nominally non-partisan, Kasko serves as state Republican Party Committeeman from Camden County and previously served as Haddonfield's Republican Party Chairman and as an aide to Republican Governor Christine Todd Whitman.  Moscatelli and Rochford are unaffiliated voters and are not currently involved with local or state Democratic or Republican party activities.

In 2018, the borough had an average property tax bill of $15,182, the highest in the county (though the mini municipality of Tavistock had an average bill of $31,376 for its three homes), compared to an average bill of $8,767 statewide.

Borough Hall

Borough Hall, the home of Haddonfield government, is located at 242 King's Highway East and was built in 1928 by Walter William Sharpley. There are four main offices, including those for the tax assessor, the construction office and the municipal court office.  Borough Hall includes a police department, a courtroom, and an auditorium. Its walls are of marble, steel, or plaster, although police station main walls are of steel and cinder block. Haddonfield police write about 8,000 tickets and receive about 300 criminal complaints each year.

In Borough Hall's auditorium are paintings of men who signed the United States Declaration of Independence from New Jersey: Abraham Clark, Francis Hopkinson, Richard Stockton, and John Witherspoon. Some of the paintings are original, other copies. 
 
Weddings have been held in Borough Hall, and while asbestos was being removed from the public library, the upper level of Borough Hall became a temporary library.

Borough Commissioner's meetings are held at Borough Hall every second and fourth Tuesday of the month, usually in the courtroom but sometimes, if there is a large attendance, in the auditorium.

Fire department 

Since 1764, Haddonfield has been the home of Haddon Fire Co. No. 1, the second-oldest fire department in continuous service in the United States.

Federal, state and county representation 
Haddonfield is located in the 1st Congressional District and is part of New Jersey's 6th state legislative district.

Politics
As of March 2011, there were a total of 9,081 registered voters in Haddonfield, of which 3,268 (36.0%) were registered as Democrats, 2,232 (24.6%) were registered as Republicans and 3,575 (39.4%) were registered as Unaffiliated. There were 6 voters registered as Libertarians or Greens.

In the 2012 presidential election, Democrat Barack Obama received 55.3% of the vote (3,849 cast), ahead of Republican Mitt Romney with 43.9% (3,054 votes), and other candidates with 0.7% (51 votes), among the 6,985 ballots cast by the borough's 10,054 registered voters (31 ballots were spoiled), for a turnout of 69.5%. In the 2008 presidential election, Democrat Barack Obama received 59.4% of the vote (4,346 cast), ahead of Republican John McCain, who received around 38.2% (2,793 votes), with 7,311 ballots cast among the borough's 8,970 registered voters, for a turnout of 81.5%. In the 2004 presidential election, Democrat John Kerry received 54.1% of the vote (3,946 ballots cast), outpolling Republican George W. Bush, who received around 44.7% (3,264 votes), with 7,300 ballots cast among the borough's 8,912 registered voters, for a turnout percentage of 81.9.

In the 2013 gubernatorial election, Republican Chris Christie received 62.1% of the vote (2,519 cast), ahead of Democrat Barbara Buono with 36.6% (1,483 votes), and other candidates with 1.3% (52 votes), among the 4,147 ballots cast by the borough's 9,791 registered voters (93 ballots were spoiled), for a turnout of 42.4%. In the 2009 gubernatorial election, Republican Chris Christie received 46.9% of the vote (2,208 ballots cast), ahead of both Democrat Jon Corzine with 46.6% (2,195 votes) and Independent Chris Daggett with 5.3% (249 votes), with 4,712 ballots cast among the borough's 9,138 registered voters, yielding a 51.6% turnout.

Education

Public schools 
The Haddonfield Public Schools is a comprehensive public school district serving students in pre-kindergarten through twelfth grade. The district serves students from Haddonfield, along with those from Pine Valley and Tavistock who attend the district's schools as part of sending/receiving relationships. As of the 2018–19 school year, the district, comprised of five schools, had an enrollment of 2,749 students and 215.2 classroom teachers (on an FTE basis), for a student–teacher ratio of 12.8:1. Schools in the district (with 2018–19 enrollment data from the National Center for Education Statistics) are 
Central Elementary School with 419 students in grades K–5, 
Elizabeth Haddon Elementary School with 367 students in grades K–5,
J. Fithian Tatem Elementary School with 422 students in grades Pre-K–5, 
Haddonfield Middle School with 659 students in grades 6–8 and 
Haddonfield Memorial High School with 869 students in grades 9–12.

In 2015, Elizabeth Haddon School was one of 15 schools in New Jersey, and one of nine public schools, recognized as a National Blue Ribbon School in the exemplary high performing category by the United States Department of Education.

During the 2004–2005 school year, Haddonfield Memorial High School was awarded the National Blue Ribbon School Award of Excellence by the United States Department of Education, the highest award an American school can receive. The school was the 33rd-ranked public high school in New Jersey out of 328 schools statewide in New Jersey Monthly magazine's September 2012 cover story on the state's "Top Public High Schools", after being ranked 11th in 2010 out of 322 schools listed.

Private schools 
Haddonfield Friends School, a Quaker school that dates back to 1786, served 167 students in Pre-K through eighth grade.

Kingsway Learning Center provides special education for students from ages birth to 14 at the Haddonfield campus, which is home to the school's Early Intervention Program and its Elementary Program.

Christ the King Regional School, founded in 1940, serves students in Pre-K3 through eighth grade and operates under the auspices of the Roman Catholic Diocese of Camden.

Bancroft School, founded in Haddonfield in 1883 and located there until 2017, is special education school and neurobehavioral stabilization program. In July 2005, Bancroft began soliciting requests for proposals to purchase its  property, as a precursor to moving from Haddonfield. Bancroft is now located in neighboring Mount Laurel, but during the late 2010s, redevelopment of the Bancroft property in Haddonfield became a locally contentious issue.

Special events 
There are events such as the community sidewalk sale in the summer, and the fall festival in October. The fall festival is an event where community organizations may have booths along Kings Highway and there is scarecrow-making for kids.  Haddonfield hosts a weekly farmers' market on Saturdays from May to November.  There is also the Haddonfield Crafts & Fine Arts Festival, where a large variety of vendors line the main street. Another event is First Night, a New Year's Eve celebration of the arts, with a variety of performances was held in town until 2016. There is also a yearly car show that takes place during the second Saturday of September. There are also events such as historic house tours and designer show houses.

Transportation 
Haddonfield prides itself on being very walkable; most streets have sidewalks, and due to the small size of the town— or less from any point in Haddonfield to any other as the crow flies—it is possible to walk to any part of the community.

Roads and highways

Route 41 (Kings Highway) passes through the center of the borough and intersects County Route 561 (Haddon Avenue) at Haddonfield's main business district. Interstate 295 is adjacent to the southern tip with Exit 31 straddling the border. The New Jersey Turnpike briefly cross through the borough, but the closest exit is Interchange 3 in Bellmawr / Runnemede.

Public transportation

The PATCO Speedline Haddonfield station links it to Philadelphia, Pennsylvania, in the west and to the eastern terminus in Lindenwold, New Jersey, where it is possible to transfer to NJ Transit's bus and rail routes connecting Philadelphia to Atlantic City.

NJ Transit provides local bus service; its 451, 455, and 457 routes all stop at the PATCO station.

Popular culture
In the film When Harry Met Sally... (directed by Rob Reiner), Billy Crystal's character, Harry, is from Haddonfield.
Several films in the Halloween franchise are set in fictional Haddonfield, Illinois which was inspired by Haddonfield, N.J.  Debra Hill, the co-writer of the original film, grew up in Haddonfield, New Jersey.
A scene in the film AI takes place in Haddonfield and captures a shot of a house on Kings Highway. This is the location of the Flesh Fair, a rally of anti-robot activists.
Photographer Frank Stefanko took two famous album covers for Bruce Springsteen in Haddonfield: Darkness on the Edge of Town (1978) and The River (1980).

Notable people

People who were born in, residents of, or otherwise closely associated with Haddonfield include:

 John Adler (1959–2011), politician who served as the U.S. representative for New Jersey's 3rd congressional district from 2009 until 2011
 Graham Alexander (born 1989), singer-songwriter, entertainer, and entrepreneur known for the Broadway shows Rain: A Tribute to the Beatles and Let It Be and as the founder of a new incarnation of the Victor Talking Machine Co.
 Abraham Anderson (1829–1915), businessman who was a co-founder of the Campbell Soup Company
 George Batten (1891–1972), second baseman who played in a single MLB game, for the New York Highlanders
 Aimee Belgard (born 1974), lawyer and politician who serves as a judge in New Jersey Superior Court
 Brian Boucher (born 1977), NHL goalie
 Sam Bradford (born 1987), former Heisman Trophy winner who is quarterback for the Arizona Cardinals
 Andy Breckman (born 1955), film and television writer whose work includes Monk
 Daniel Brière (born 1977), NHL player
 Alexander Oswald Brodie (1849–1918),  military officer and engineer who was appointed as Governor of Arizona Territory from 1902 to 1905
 Robert Byrd (born 1942), author and illustrator
 William T. Cahill (1912–1996), Governor of New Jersey (1970–1974)
 Joanna Cassidy (born 1945), actress, born and raised in Haddonfield
 Bobby Clarke (born 1949), former hockey player and executive with the Philadelphia Flyers
 Edward Drinker Cope (1840–1897), paleontologist and comparative anatomist, lived in Haddonfield to be closer to fossils in nearby marl pits
 James A. Corea (1937–2001), radio personality and specialist in nutrition, rehabilitation and sports medicine
 William K. Dickey (1920–2008), politician who served as Speaker of the New Jersey General Assembly and as chairman of the Delaware River Port Authority
 Greg Dobbs (born 1978), MLB player who played for the Philadelphia Phillies
 Erin Donohue (born 1983), athlete. Member of the U.S. track and field team at 2008 Summer Olympics (Beijing) in the 1500 meters
Quaesita Cromwell Drake (1889–1967), chemistry professor, University of Delaware, born in Haddonfield
 Alfred E. Driscoll (1902–1975), Governor of New Jersey (1947–1954), lived most of his life in historic Birdwood home built by John Estaugh Hopkins on Hopkins Lane
 Kevin Eastman (born 1955), basketball coach
 Rawly Eastwick (born 1950), former MLB relief pitcher
 Ray Emery (born 1982), NHL goalie
 Elmer Engstrom (1901–1984), President of Radio Corporation of America (RCA) who led development of television in Camden during the 1930s
 Bartholomew J. Eustace (1887–1956), Bishop of Camden from 1938 to 1956
 Nick Foles (born 1989), NFL quarterback for the Philadelphia Eagles. Actually, he lived in a part of Barrington that has a Haddonfield ZIP Code
 Claude Giroux (born 1988), NHL player
 Christian Giudice (born 1974), boxing writer and editor who has published boxing biographies.
 Thomas McLernon Greene (1926–2003), scholar of English literature
 Dan Gutman (born 1955), author
 Marielle Hall (born 1992), long-distance runner
 Derian Hatcher (born 1972), NHL player and coach for Philadelphia Flyers
 Debra Hill (1950–2005), co-writer and producer of the film Halloween which is set in the fictional town of Haddonfield, Illinois
 Jeff Hornacek (born 1963), NBA player, head coach of Phoenix Suns, lived in Haddonfield while playing for the Philadelphia 76ers
 Geoff Jenkins (born 1974), former MLB outfielder
 Pam Jenoff (born 1971, class of 1989), author of Quill award-nominated The Kommandant's Girl
 Chip Kelly (born 1963), head coach of the UCLA Bruins
 Susan Kilham (1943–2022), aquatic ecologist
 David Laganella (born 1974), avant-garde classical composer hailed as Philadelphia's best by the American Composers Orchestra
 Ian Laperrière (born 1974), NHL player and coach for the Philadelphia Flyers
 Brad Lidge (born 1976), relief pitcher for the Philadelphia Phillies
 Victoria Lombardi (born 1952), better known as Miss Vicki, the former wife of Tiny Tim.
 Mike Magill (1920–2006), race car driver who competed in the Indianapolis 500 three times
 Matt Maloney (born 1971), NBA player for the Houston Rockets, attended Christ the King and Haddonfield Memorial High School
 Charlie Manuel (born 1944), former manager of the Philadelphia Phillies Actually, he lived in a part of Barrington that has a Haddonfield ZIP Code
 Timothy Matlack (1736–1829), American Revolutionary War soldier and engrosser of the United States Declaration of Independence
 Bob McElwee (born 1935), former on-field football official for 41 years, including 27 years in the National Football League from 1976 to 2003
 Joel McHale (born 1971), comedian and actor, star of NBC sitcom Community, lived in Haddonfield for two years during elementary school
 Richard Mroz, President of the New Jersey Board of Public Utilities
 Scott Patterson (born 1958), actor, played Luke on television series Gilmore Girls
 Sergio Peresson (1913–1991), violin maker
 Chris Pronger (born 1974), NHL player
 Mike Richards (born 1985), NHL player
 James Rolfe (born 1980), creator of The Angry Video Game Nerd
 Rod Searle (1920–2014), farmer, insurance agent, and politician who served for 24 years in the Minnesota House of Representatives
 Jennifer Sey (born 1969), author, business executive and retired artistic gymnast who was the 1986 U.S. Women's All-Around National Champion
 Mel Sheppard (1883–1942), middle-distance runner who won a total of four gold medals at the 1908 Summer Olympics and 1912 Summer Olympics
 Thomas J. Shusted (1926–2004), attorney and politician who served in the New Jersey General Assembly on two separate occasions, representing Legislative District 3D from 1970 to 1972 and the 6th Legislative District from 1978 to 1991
 Tom Sims (1950–2012), pioneer and world champion of snowboarding, who created an early version after failing to complete a custom skateboard
 Jason Smith (born 1973), NHL  player
 Steven Spielberg (born 1946), film director, as a child lived in Crystal Terrace, a part of Haddon Township served by the Haddonfield post office
 Frank Stefanko (born 1946), photographer of rock music subjects including Bruce Springsteen and Patti Smith
 I. F. Stone (1907–1989), author and anti-war activist
 Kimmo Timonen (born 1975), NHL defenseman for Philadelphia Flyers
 Joseph F. Wallworth, President of the New Jersey Senate
 Eric Weinrich (born 1966), NHL player, lived in Haddonfield while playing for Philadelphia Flyers

References

External links 

 Revolutionary War sites in Haddonfield, with pictures

 
1875 establishments in New Jersey
Boroughs in Camden County, New Jersey
Populated places established in 1682
Walsh Act